Zhaleh Olov (born 6 August 1927 in Tehran, Iran) is an Iranian actress, dubber, and poet. She started her career working in radio and cinema in 1948 and an actress in theater in 1949. She made her screen debut in The Tempest of Life (1948, dir. A. Daryabeigi).
She dubbed cartoons for the first time in Iran with Walt Disney cartoons, such as Cinderella, Pinocchio, Sleeping Beauty, One Hundred and One Dalmatians, Snow White and the Seven Dwarfs, and The Aristocats.

Filmography 
 The Tempest of life (1948)
 The Prisoner of Emire (1948)
 The Spring Variety (1949)
 Aqa Mohammad Khan (1954)
 The Adventure of Life (1954)
 The Bride of Tigris (1954)
 The Accuzation (1956)
 Yaghoub Leyth (1957)
 The Broken Talisman (1957)
 Bijhan and Manijheh (1958)
 The Viper's Fang (1961)
 The White Gold (1962)
 The Key (1961)
 Hookani (1969, unfinished)
 Shirin and Farhad (1970)
 Leili and Majnun (1970)
 Wood Pigeon (Toghi) (1970, directed by Ali Hatami)
 The Window (1970)
 The Bridge (1971)
 Dash Akol (1971)
 The Hour of Disaster (1972)
 The Lollipop (1972)
 The Voice of Desert (1975) 
 The Lost Time (1989)
 The Fateful Day (1994)
 The Snowman (1994)
 Sultan (1996)
 Mum's Guest (2003)
No Choice (2020)

TV series 
 Amir Kabir (1985)
 Small Paradise (1991)
 Once Upon a Time (Roozi roozgari) (1991)
 Brighter Than Darkness (1992)
 The Gun Loaded (2002-2003)

References

External links 
 

1927 births
Living people
Poets from Tehran
Iranian radio actors
Actresses from Tehran
Iranian film actresses
Iranian stage actresses
Iranian voice actresses
Iranian television actresses
20th-century Iranian actresses
Recipients of the Order of Culture and Art
Iranian Science and Culture Hall of Fame recipients in Cinema